Casey James Mears (born March 12, 1978) is an American professional off-road and stock car racing driver. He has raced in IndyCar, NASCAR's three national series including 15 seasons in the Cup Series, SCORE International, and the Stadium Super Trucks. A former winner of the Coca-Cola 600, Mears is the nephew of four-time Indianapolis 500 winner Rick Mears and the son of IndyCar and off-road veteran Roger Mears. He also works as a NASCAR analyst for Fox Sports 1.

Early career and open-wheel racing
After racing in go-karts for a season in 1991, Mears began competing in the SuperLites Off-Road Series in 1992 where he posted several top-three finishes. He moved to sprint cars in 1994 and finished third in the Jim Russell USAC Triple Crown Championship, with a win at Mesa Marin Raceway. The next season, he won the championship in the USAC series.

In 1996, Mears made his Dayton Indy Lights debut at the Cleveland Grand Prix and finished eighth. The following year, he competed full-time in the Indy Lights championship and in 1999 finished second, losing by 14 points. He was also just the fourth driver in Indy Lights series history to complete every lap in a single season. Mears continued to compete in the Indy Lights in 2000 and won his first race at the Grand Prix of Houston meeting in October.

After testing Indy Cars for multiple teams in 2000, Mears was offered a chance to drive a third entry for Team Rahal at California Speedway in October. After qualifying 15th and leading 10 laps, he posted a career-best fourth finish in his CART Series debut. He ran three IRL events at the start of the 2001 season and attempted to qualify for the 2001 Indianapolis 500, but ultimately did not make it. He ended the season by filling in for injured Champ Car driver Alex Zanardi, posting one top-10 finish in four starts.

Mears had five CART starts, with one top-5 finish, and three IRL starts, with no top-5 finishes.

NASCAR
Mears made his NASCAR debut in the Busch Series in 2001 at Homestead-Miami Speedway, driving the No.66 car for Cicci-Welliver Racing. He started 21st and finished 28th. When the team was sold to Wayne Jesel the next season, Mears drove for them full-time, finishing 21st in points with two Top 10 finishes. To the surprise of many, he was selected by Chip Ganassi Racing to drive the No. 41 Target-sponsored Dodge in 2003. In his rookie season, he finished 35th after failing to finish in the Top 10 in any race. Throughout 2003, Mears drove a number of ARCA races for Ganassi, winning three times, once at Michigan, and sweeping both Pocono races. He drove the No. 41 Cup car for two additional seasons, and won two poles in 2004.

Mears came close to quite a lot of victories during this period. He led late in the 2004 Sirius at the Glen but got passed with 12 laps to go and finished fourth. At Homestead in 2005, Mears controlled the final 100 laps of the Ford 400, but after a yellow flag (with 19 laps to go) erased his 28-second lead, Mears had to make a pit stop thus forfeiting the lead and with it, the win.

During the 2005 season, it was announced Mears would move to a separate car for Ganassi with Home123 sponsorship, with the No. 41 to be piloted by Reed Sorenson. The Home123 sponsorship fell through and he instead moved to the No. 42 Texaco/Havoline-sponsored Dodge for Ganassi, replacing the departing Jamie McMurray.

Mears started off 2006 with a then-best career finish of second, passing Ryan Newman at the line as Mears' future teammate Jimmie Johnson won the 2006 Daytona 500.

On June 6, 2006, Mears announced that he was leaving Chip Ganassi Racing at the end of the season to join Hendrick Motorsports for the 2007 season, to replace the departing Brian Vickers. On July 8, 2006, he finally won his first NASCAR race, a Busch Series race at Chicagoland Speedway, coasting to the finish after running out of fuel.

For the 2007 season, Mears assumed driving duties for the No. 25 Hendrick Chevrolet, with co-primary sponsorships from the National Guard of the United States and GMAC. On May 27, 2007, he won the Coca-Cola 600 at Charlotte, his first (and only to date) career Nextel Cup victory. Once again, Mears secured the win with a fuel gamble, taking the lead with five laps remaining when most of the other lead lap cars stopped for fuel. Mears stretched his fuel to the finish, running out moments after the checkered flag.

In 2008, Mears moved to the Alan Gustafson-led No. 5 Kellogg's/Carquest-sponsored Chevrolet Impala formerly driven by Kyle Busch. After going winless, Mears was released by Hendrick and replaced by veteran Mark Martin.

On August 23, 2008, Mears was announced as the driver of Richard Childress Racing's No. 07 Jack Daniel's-sponsored Chevrolet Impala SS. The previous driver of the car, Clint Bowyer, would drive the team's new No. 33 General Mills-sponsored Chevrolet Impala SS. In his first season at RCR, Mears notched two Top 10 finishes. After Mears struggled during the first seven races of the year, Richard Childress switched the crew chiefs for Harvick and Mears' cars, hoping for a better performance from the two drivers. The switch seemed to work for both parties.

On October 21, 2009, it was announced Mears would be getting his third crew chief of the season starting at Talladega. Todd Berrier would be moving to the No. 31 team in place of Scott Miller. Doug Randolph took over as the crew chief on the No. 07. This move was made primarily because the future of the 07 was uncertain and Childress wanted to keep Berrier in the family. After the switch, Mears struggled with his new crew chief and had the best finish of 19th at Homestead. Mears was released by Richard Childress Racing following the 2009 season.

It was announced on January 20, 2010, that Mears would drive the No. 90 Key Motorsports Chevrolet. Mears failed to qualify for the 2010 Daytona 500, ending a starting streak of 252 consecutive races; this was Mears' first DNQ of his career. Mears also failed to qualify for Fontana, Las Vegas, and Atlanta. After qualifying for Martinsville was rained out and the team did not qualify, Mears was released by the team. Following his release from Key Motorsports, Joe Gibbs announced that Mears would be on standby status while JGR driver, Denny Hamlin, recovered from ACL surgery; however, Hamlin did not require a replacement and therefore Mears did not drive in either of the two races. Beginning on April 27, 2010, Mears briefly became the driver for Tommy Baldwin's No. 36 team. On May 13, 2010, Mears was announced as the temporary replacement driver for the No. 83 Team Red Bull at Dover, replacing a sick Brian Vickers.

During the June race at Michigan International Speedway, while racing near the back of the field, Mears wrecked his Team Red Bull teammate, Scott Speed. Speed went on to finish 28th and Mears finished 36th. Following the race, Speed was critical of the incident, and Mears was soon replaced by Reed Sorenson. Mears returned to TBR beginning with the Lenox Industrial Tools 301 at New Hampshire Motor Speedway on June 27, 2010, where he finished 29th, only two laps down.

Mears stepped into his fourth car of the season at Atlanta in September, driving the No. 13 GEICO-sponsored Toyota for Germain Racing. It was also announced in August 2010 that Mears would continue to drive this car for the remainder of the 2010 season and all of the 2011 season. Mears attempted to qualify for his initial Sprint Cup appearance with the team at Atlanta Motor Speedway for the September 5 Emory Healthcare 500.

The 2011 season started off with his second DNQ at the Daytona 500. Due to two engines failing him during Speedweeks, Mears was unable to secure a position on the starting grid. Germain Racing secured sponsorship from GEICO and Hard Rock Vodka for a combined 29 races. Mears finished 31st in driver points.

GEICO announced on January 6, 2012, that they signed a two-year deal with Mears and Germain. Germain also announced that the team was switching to Ford from Toyota for the 2012 season, gaining technical support from Roush Fenway Racing and engines from Roush-Yates. On August 24, 2012, Mears won the pole for the Irwin Tools Night Race due to the Friday qualifying session being rained out. Mears finished 30th in the final point standings.

On February 21, 2013, GEICO announced that they were sponsoring Mears and Germain full-time for the 2013 and 2014 seasons. Valvoline Next-Gen also sponsored Mears for two races. In the 2013 Coke Zero 400 at Daytona International Speedway, Mears recorded the team's best finish at an oval track, ninth. Mears finished 24th in points, his best since driving for RCR in 2009.

For 2014, Germain Racing partnered with Richard Childress Racing to field Chevrolets. Mears began the season on a high note with a tenth-place finish in the Daytona 500. At Richmond, Mears ran in the Top 10 for part of the race, but got into a fist-fight with Marcos Ambrose who was furious over a late racing incident. Two days later, Mears was fined $15,000 and put on probation for one month. During the 2014 season, Mears recorded 14 Top 20 finishes, including three Top 10’a and one Top 5. He finished 26th in points.

For 2015, Mears returned to Germain for what was to be the final year of both his and GEICO's contracts with the team. Mears finished sixth at Daytona and 15th at Atlanta to open the season.

On July 14, 2015, it was announced that Mears had signed a contract extension with Germain and GEICO for 2016. On November 12, 2015, GEICO announced that it had extended its partnership with Mears and Germain Racing through the 2018 season. Team owner Bob Germain confirmed that Mears had extended his contract with the team through 2018 as well.

Mears had a rough 2016 season, finishing 32nd at Daytona after caught speeding in the late of the race. Mears would finish better next week at Atlanta, finishing 14th. He was unlucky after being involved in a small accident which ended Mears in contention for the win at Talladega. On November 28, 2016, Germain announced that Ty Dillon would replace Mears in the No. 13 starting in 2017.

On February 20, 2017, Mears announced via Twitter that he would drive the No. 98 Ford Mustang for Biagi-DenBeste Racing in the Xfinity Series for 12 races. After Aric Almirola's injury, his schedule was increased with two more races (Pocono and Daytona 2). Mears ended up running 14 races in the No. 98 car with the best finish of 9th.

In 2019, Mears returned to the Cup Series with Germain, driving the No. 27 Chevrolet at the Daytona 500. After starting 40th, Mears finished in the same position when an early-race shunt with Parker Kligerman ended his day.

Grand-Am
In 2005, Mears teamed with Scott Dixon and Darren Manning in the Chip Ganassi Lexus Riley. They finished in 6th place. The following year, he won the 24 Hours of Daytona alongside Dixon and Dan Wheldon; they set a race record for the Daytona Prototype category, running 723 laps in 24 hours to score the win. Mears became the first ever full-time NASCAR driver to win the Rolex 24 overall.

In 2009, Mears shared the No. 2 Gentleman Jack Pontiac-Crawford with Andy Wallace, Rob Finley and Danica Patrick. They suffered electrical and handling issues during the race and finished eighth.

Off-road racing
Following his family legacy, Mears entered desert racing in 2019 when he debuted in SCORE International's Baja 1000. He shared the No. 42 Ford Raptor trophy truck, which was built by the Geiser Brothers and sponsored by Axalta, with multi-time race class winner Doug Fortin. After dealing with engine issues brought upon by hitting a mud puddle, the Mears–Fortin duo finished 28th overall and 12th in the Trophy Truck class.

Mears returned to the Baja 1000 in 2021, co-driving the No. 77 trophy truck with Robby Gordon. The opportunity arose following an encounter between the two when they were attending Roger Mears' Off-Road Motorsports Hall of Fame induction ceremony. Mears and Gordon were also among four former NASCAR race winners in the event alongside Brendan Gaughan and Justin Lofton. The No. 77 finished 13th overall and seventh in class.

Stadium Super Trucks

In January 2017, Mears tested a Stadium Super Truck, a series owned by former NASCAR driver Robby Gordon; the Stadium Super Trucks are similar to the stadium trucks raced by Mears' father Roger, though they contain V8 engines instead of V6. In December, he made his series debut at the season-ending Lake Elsinore Diamond rounds. He failed to qualify for the first race's main event after finishing seventh in his heat race, but a fourth-place run in the following day's heat allowed him to compete in that evening's feature, in which he finished fifth.

The following year, he ran his first SST race at Road America, driving the No. 25 truck in place of Arie Luyendyk Jr. to sixth- and twelfth-place runs. He later raced in the series' rounds at Glen Helen Regional Park and the Race of Champions.

In 2019, he participated in the SST race weekend at Honda Indy Toronto. He later ran the Mid-Ohio Sports Car Course weekend, where he finished second in the Friday round.

Motorsports career results

American open-wheel racing
(key) (Races in bold indicate pole position) (Races in italics indicate fastest lap)

Indy Lights

CART

Indy Racing League

NASCAR
(key) (Bold – Pole position awarded by qualifying time. Italics – Pole position earned by points standings or practice time. * – Most laps led.)

Monster Energy Cup Series

Daytona 500

Xfinity Series

 Season still in progress
 Ineligible for series points

ARCA Re/Max Series
(key) (Bold – Pole position awarded by qualifying time. Italics – Pole position earned by points standings or practice time. * – Most laps led.)

24 Hours of Daytona
(key)

Stadium Super Trucks
(key) (Bold – Pole position. Italics – Fastest qualifier. * – Most laps led.)

References

External links

 
 

Living people
1978 births
Racing drivers from Bakersfield, California
24 Hours of Daytona drivers
NASCAR drivers
ARCA Menards Series drivers
Champ Car drivers
IndyCar Series drivers
Indy Lights drivers
Stadium Super Trucks drivers
Chip Ganassi Racing drivers
Hendrick Motorsports drivers
Richard Childress Racing drivers
Off-road racing drivers
Mo Nunn Racing drivers
Rahal Letterman Lanigan Racing drivers